Xingning Air Base is a military airfield 5 km west of Xingning.

External links
https://fas.org/nuke/guide/china/facility/xingning.htm

Chinese Air Force bases
Airports in Guangdong